Goldsby is a town in McClain County, Oklahoma, United States. It lies within the Washington public school district and is home to the second largest casino in Oklahoma. As of the 2010 Census, the estimated population was 1,801, a 57 percent increase since 2000.

Geography
Goldsby is located at  (35.146712, -97.473764).

Goldsby is closely tied to its neighbor to the south, Washington. As Goldsby has no post office, mail is processed through the Washington post office (zip 73093). Goldsby falls within the boundaries of the Washington public school district. However, Goldsby provides Washington with other resources such as fire department and water services.

Climate
Goldsby tornado activity is above the Oklahoma state average and 412% greater than the U.S. average.

Features
The second largest casino in Oklahoma (Riverwind Casino) is located in Goldsby on State Highway 9.

The Town of Goldsby maintains one airport for general aviation usage, David Jay Perry Airport, as well as several private landing fields. Goldsby is also the home of the Albert Engstrom Forest Regeneration Center.

The town includes several small businesses. Goldsby also has a state tag agency, community center, and a veterans' memorial.

Demographics

As of the 2012 United States Census estimate, there were 1,891 people living in the city, a 57 percent increase since 2000. The population density was 98 people per square mile (38/km2). As of 2009, there were 516 housing units at an average density of 27 per square mile (10/km2). As of 2009, 1,579 residents (74%) self-identified as white, 341 (16%) self-identified as Hispanic or Latino, 117 (5.5%) self-identified as Native American, and 93 (4.4%) self-identified as of two or more races.

As of 2009, there were 1,209 households, out of which 1,108 (92%) were families, 258 (21%) were married couples with children, 45 (3.7%) were single-parent households, and 101 (8.4%) were single individuals living alone. As of 2000, the average household size was 2.63 and the average family size was 3.01.

As of 2000, the population was spread out, with 26.2% under the age of 18, 9.8% from 18 to 24, 30.1% from 25 to 44, 24.5% from 45 to 64, and 9.4% who were 65 years of age or older. As of 2011, the median age was 39.3 years and the population was 52.1% female and 47.9% male.

As of the 2011 United States Census estimate, the median income for a household in the town was $53,847 and the per capita income was 25,358. As of 2009, the median income for a family was $56,717. As of 2000, males had a median income of $33,281 versus $23,750 and about 6.7 percent of families and 8 percent of the population were below the poverty line, including 5.1% of those under age 18 and 8.3% of those age 65 or over.

References

External links
 Encyclopedia of Oklahoma History and Culture - Goldsby

Oklahoma City metropolitan area
Towns in McClain County, Oklahoma
Towns in Oklahoma